Ludwig Helmbold, also spelled Ludwig Heimbold, (21 January 1532 – 8 April 1598) was a poet of Lutheran hymns. He is probably best known for his hymn "Nun laßt uns Gott dem Herren", of which J. S. Bach used the fifth stanza for his cantata O heilges Geist- und Wasserbad, BWV 165; Bach also used his words in BWV 73, 79 and 186a.

Biography 
Helmbold was born in Mühlhausen. He became a professor of Philosophy an der Erfurt University in 1554. In 1571 he was appointed a minister at the Marienkirche in Mühlhausen, later as Superintendent.

Helmbold was crowned poeta laureatus by Maximilian II, Holy Roman Emperor, in 1566 on the Reichstag at Augsburg.

Hymns
The Mühlhausen cantors Joachim a Burck and Johannes Eccard set many of Helmbold's more than hundred hymns to music. Some of his works were used by Johann Sebastian Bach in his cantatas, such as 
 Herr, wie du willt, so schicks mit mir, BWV 73
 Gott der Herr ist Sonn und Schild, BWV 79
 Ärgre dich, o Seele, nicht, BWV 186a
 O heilges Geist- und Wasserbad, BWV 165.

A few of his hymns are still included in the German Protestant hymnal Evangelisches Gesangbuch (EG):
 EG 320: "Nun lasst uns Gott, dem Herren"
 EG 365: "Von Gott will ich nicht lassen" (Also in Evangelical Lutheran Hymnary, #465)
 EG (Nordelbien) 558: "Amen, Gott Vater und Sohne"

Other recognition
In 1998, a street named Helmboldstraße, next to Bonatstraße, was named after him in Mühlhausen.

References

Literature

External links 

 
 Entries for Ludwig Helmbold on WorldCat

16th-century German poets
16th-century German male writers
1532 births
1598 deaths
Academic staff of the University of Erfurt
German male poets
16th-century male writers
Clergy from Thuringia